Sri Venkateswara Temple, Pittsburgh is a Hindu temple in Penn Hills, Pennsylvania, and serves the Hindu population of the Pittsburgh Metropolitan Area. The temple is located on South Mccully Drive. The temple is modeled on shrines in Southern India and, as of 2014, served nearly 10,000 Hindus in the area. The temple has 50,000 members worldwide with pilgrims coming from as far as India and Canada to visit.

History
The Hindu Temple Society of Pittsburgh was established in 1973 and in 1974, gained 400,000 Dollars in funding from the national Hindu Temple Society of North America in New York. The Groundbreaking Ceremony occurred on June 30, 1976 and opened the next day. SV Temple Pittsburgh began a "Indianzation" remodeling in 2005, with a cost of $1.5 million. The temple was remodeled to look like Sri Venkateswara Temple in Tirupati. In 2011, SV Temple Pittsburgh was robbed of 15,000 dollars worth of credit cards and jewels.

Design
The temple was designed by The Endowment Department of Andhra Pradesh. The temple is designed with two sides and a tower in the middle symbolizing two hands and a head. The temple operates a cafeteria as well in its basement.

See also
Old Vedanta Society Temple, San Francisco, first Hindu temple in North America

References

Asian-American culture in Pittsburgh
Buildings and structures in Allegheny County, Pennsylvania
Religious buildings and structures completed in 1976
Religious organizations established in 1973
Hindu temples in Pennsylvania
Indian-American culture in Pennsylvania
1973 establishments in Pennsylvania
Religious buildings and structures in Allegheny County, Pennsylvania